The Anderson Cup is a hockey tournament for clubs that are members of the Premier League of the Ulster Senior League. The current holder is Kilkeel.

Trophy

The trophy was donated to the Ulster Hockey Union of the Irish Hockey Association by Mr T N Anderson as a memorial for his brother Captain J G Anderson MC. Captain Anderson was a prominent member of the Banbridge Hockey Club and Irish International player who was killed whilst serving in the Royal Army Medical Corps in World War I. One of the conditions requested by the donor was that the Final should be played at the ground of Banbridge Hockey Club. The Ulster Hockey Union agreed to this condition except for when Banbridge was one of the Finalists.

Current format
From 2015-16, the competition reverted from nine-a-side back to eleven-a-side. Played in the second half of the season, all Ulster Premier League teams take part. From 2018-19 Ulster members of the Irish Hockey League also take part.

Historical formats

Until the reorganisation of Senior hockey after the 2000-01 season, all the senior league clubs participated in the Anderson Cup. The trophy was competed for through an open draw.

Between 2001-02 and 2008-09 the eight teams competing in the Premier League of the Ulster Senior League were drawn into two groups of four. The winners and runners-up of these two groups then proceeded to the semi-finals.

The competition became a nine-a-side tournament until reverting to eleven-a-side in 2015-16.

The gate receipts at the Final of the competition were donated to hospital charities, and the competition was often referred to as the Anderson Charity Cup. At the 1926 Final record gate receipts of £50 was reported.

Following the reorganisation of the league structure following the 2008-09 season until 2014-15, the ten clubs of the Premier League of the Ulster Senior League and the ten Section One teams competed for the trophy. The competition reverted to an open draw format.

Finals

1920s

1930s

1940s

1950s

1960s

1970s

1980s

1990s

2000s

2010s

Sources

External links
 Ulster Branch of Irish Hockey Association

Field hockey competitions in Ulster
1919 establishments in Ireland
Field hockey cup competitions in Ireland